The following events related to sociology occurred in the 1980s.

1980
Raymond Boudon's Crisis in sociology : problems of sociological epistemology is published.
William Catton's Overshoot is published.
Michel Foucault's Power/Knowledge is published.
Richard Sennett's Authority is published.
Immanuel Wallerstein's The Modern World-System (volume 2): Mercantilism and the Consolidation of the European World-Economy, 1600-1750

1981
Raymond Boudon's Logic of social action : an introduction to sociological analysis is published.
Andre Gunder Frank's Crisis in the third world is published.
Erving Goffman's Forms of Talk is published.
Jürgen Habermas's The Theory of Communicative Action is published.
Thomas Humphrey Marshall's The Right of Welfare and Other Essays is published.
Leslie George Scarman's Brixton disorders 10–12 April 1981 : report of an enquiry is published.
Alain Touraine's La Voix et le Regard is published.
Michel Wieviorka establishes the Centre d'Analyses et d'Interventions Sociologique (CADIS)

1982
Raymond Boudon's and François Bourricaud's Dictionnaire critique de la sociologie is published.
Centre for Contemporary Cultural Studies' The Empire Strikes Back: Race and Racism in 70s Britain is published.
Colin Crouch's Trade unions : the logic of collective action is published.
Andre Gunder Frank's Dynamics of the Global Crisis is published.
Edmund Leach's Social Anthropology is published.
Doug McAdam's Political Process and the Development of the Black Insurgency 1930-1970 is published.
Ralph Miliband's Capitalist Democracy in Britain is published.
Karl Popper's Quantum Theory and the Schism in Physics is published.
Rosalind H. Williams' Dream Worlds is published.
Erving Goffman serves as president of the American Sociological Association.

Deaths
November 19: Erving Goffman

1983
Benedict Anderson's Imagined Communities is published.
Raymond Aron's Clausewitz is published.
Ernest Gellner's Nations and Nationalism is published.
Ian Hacking's Representing and Intervening is published.
Sandra Harding's and Merrill B. Hintikka's (eds.) Discovering Reality is published.
Sal Restivo's The Social Relations of Physics, Mysticism, and Mathematics is published
Morris Janowitz's The Reconstruction of Patriotism is published.
Jean-François Lyotard's The Differend is published.
Ralph Miliband's Class, Power and State Power is published.
Jean-Luc Nancy's La communauté désoeuvrée is published.
Jean-Luc Nancy's L'Impératif catégorique is published.
Alain Touraine's Solidarity: The Analysis of a Social Movement is published.
Michael Young's Social scientist as innovator is published.
Alice S. Rossi serves as president of the ASA.

Deaths
October 17: Raymond Aron

1984

Anthony Giddens' The Constitution of Society
Christopher Lasch's The Minimal Self is published.
Charles Murray's Losing Ground: American Social Policy, 1950-1980 is published.
Michael Piore's & Charles Sabel's Second industrial divide : possibilities for prosperity is published.
Roy Wallis' The Elementary Forms of the New Religious Life is published.

1985

James S. Coleman's Becoming Adult in a Changing Society is published.
Ernest Gellner's The Psychoanalytic Movement is published.
David Harvey's Consciousness and the Urban Experience is published.
Michel Maffesoli's Shadow of Dionysus is published.
Neil Postman's Amusing Ourselves to Death is published.
Jeffrey Weeks' Sexuality and its Discontents is published.
Viviana Zelizer's Pricing the Priceless Child: The Changing Social Value of Children is published.

1986
Jean Baudrillard's America is published.
Ulrich Beck's Risk Society is published.
Raymond Boudon's Theories of social change : a critical appraisal is published.
Fei Xiaotong and others' Small Towns in China: Functions, Problems & Prospects is published.
Amos Hawley's Human Ecology is published.
Gilbert Lewis' Concepts of Health and Illness in a Sepik Society is published.
Michael Mann's Sources of Social Power (volume 1) is published.

1987
James Coleman's Public and Private High Schools is published.
Sandra Harding's Feminism and Methodology is published.
Sandra Harding's and Jean F O'Barr's Sex and Scientific Inquiry is published.
George Homans' Certainties and Doubts is published.
Paul Gilroy's Ain't No Black in The Union Jack is published.
Scott Lash's and John Urry's The End of organized capitalism is published.
The European Amalfi Prize for Sociology and Social Sciences gives its first award to  Norbert Elias for his Society of Individuals.

1988
Stanley Aronowitz's Science as Power is published.
John Bowlby's A Secure Base is published.
Frances Fox Piven's and Richard Cloward's Why Americans Don't Vote is published.
Dick Hobbs' Doing the Business is published.
Michel Maffesoli's The Time of the Tribes: The Decline of Individualism in Mass Society is published.
Andrew W. Metcalfe's For freedom and dignity : historical agency and class structures in the coalfields of NSW is published.
Serge Moscovici's La machine à faire des dieux is published and wins the European Amalfi Prize for Sociology and Social Sciences.
Tom Schuller's and Michael Young's [ed.] Rhythms of society is published.
Michel Wieviorka's Society and terrorism is published and wins the Bulzoni Editore Special Award.
Herbert J. Gans serves as president of the American Sociological Association.

1989
Zygmunt Bauman's Modernity and the Holocaust is published and wins the European Amalfi Prize for Sociology and Social Sciences.
Thomas Bottomore's and Robert Brym's (ed.) The Capitalist Class is published.
Raymond Boudon's Analysis of ideology is published.
Ralph Miliband's Class Struggle in Contemporary Capitalism is published.
Immanuel Wallerstein's The Modern World-System (all volumes) are published.
Joan Huber serves as president of the ASA.

Deaths
May 29: George C. Homans

References 

Sociology
Sociology timelines
1980s decade overviews